Westcott Field was a stadium in University Park, Texas (an enclave of Dallas) on the campus of Southern Methodist University. It became the Washburne Soccer and Track Stadium in 2022.

The 4,000-seat stadium is home to SMU men's and women's soccer. SMU has some fame in the American soccer community as being the only major university in Texas to field a men's NCAA Division I soccer team, even though the game is tremendously popular at the youth level statewide, and the Texas youth soccer scene is heralded nationwide.

Westcott field was used as a training facility during the 1994 FIFA World Cup. The Netherlands, Germany, Bulgaria, and Sweden trained at Westcott.

External links
Information at SMU athletics
 
Westcott Field Official Page

Soccer venues in Texas
SMU Mustangs sports venues
SMU Mustangs soccer